The Rechter Prize is an Israeli architecture prize awarded bi-annually and intended to "encourage landmark projects of Israeli architecture". It was established in 1962 and name in honour of Ze'ev Rechter.

References

Israeli awards
Architecture awards
Israeli architecture awards
Awards established in 1962